Mike Ayers (born May 26, 1948) is a former American football coach.  He served as the head football coach at East Tennessee State University from 1985 to 1987 and Wofford College in Spartanburg, South Carolina from 1988 to 2017, compiling career college football coaching record of 218–160–2. Ayers' Wofford Terriers won five Southern Conference title, in 2003, 2007, 2010, 2012, and 2017.

Playing career
Ayers played linebacker and offensive tackle for the Tigers of Georgetown College. He also played for the baseball team and competed in gymnastics and wrestling.

Coaching career
Ayers began his coaching career as a graduate assistant and defensive coordinator at Georgetown College in 1974 and 1975. He again performed the role of assistant during stops at Newberry College and the University of Richmond. In 1980, Ayers arrived at Wofford as defensive coordinator for the Terriers under head coach Buddy Sasser. Ayers followed Sasser to East Tennessee State University, where he resumed his role as defensive coordinator before taking over the head coaching position in 1985. Ayers was hired as the head coach of the Terriers in 1988 by athletic director Danny Morrison over a milkshake at Asheville's Biltmore Dairy Bar. Wofford moved up to NCAA Division I-AA in 1995 and joined the Southern Conference in 1997. Under Ayers, the Terriers claimed five Southern Conference football championships, in 2003, 2007, 2010, 2012, and 2017. Ayers won the Eddie Robinson Award, given to the most outstanding FCS head coach, in 2003 after guiding the Terriers to a 12–2 record. He holds the black belt in karate, and is an accomplished artist and fly fisherman.

Ayers announced his retirement from coaching on December 13, 2017 after his 30th season at Wofford. He is the longest-serving coach in Wofford history and has the most wins (207) in program history. As a Wofford coach he was passionate about his players being strong men and students and doing it “the right way”, and his players have succeeded as students and in life to an exceptional degree. He was, and is, the ultimate Short-haired Dog!

Head coaching record

See also
 List of college football coaches with 200 wins

References

External links
 Wofford profile

1948 births
Living people
American football linebackers
American football offensive tackles
East Tennessee State Buccaneers football coaches
Georgetown Tigers football coaches
Georgetown Tigers football players
Newberry Wolves football coaches
Richmond Spiders football coaches
Wofford Terriers football coaches
People from Georgetown, Kentucky